Laurie Mayer is a British journalist who had a 22-year career with the BBC on radio and across most television news programmes. His last main presenting role was of South East Today for BBC News, until he resigned in 2002, citing a culture of bullying at the BBC in the South East News department.

Mayer's radio career started on BBC Radio London in 1971, mainly presenting the station's breakfast show "Rush Hour". Between 1973 and 1979, he was one of the presenters on the BBC Radio 1 news programme Newsbeat.

Mayer was a presenter of the BBC's News After Noon, Six O'Clock News and Breakfast News programme (now known as Breakfast), before leaving for Sky News in the early 1990s. He went on to become the press spokesman for the owner of Harrods, Mohammed Al Fayed, before returning to the BBC as the main presenter of South East Today.

Personal life
Mayer got engaged to his wife Jill Hanson in 1971.

References 

Year of birth missing (living people)
BBC newsreaders and journalists
Living people